Rashee Rice (born April 22, 2000) is an American football wide receiver for the SMU Mustangs.

Early life and high school
Rice grew up in North Richland Hills, Texas, and attended Richland High School. As a junior, he caught 72 passes for 1,386 yards and 19 touchdowns and was named first team all-district. Rice was rated a three-star recruit and committed to play college football at SMU entering his senior year. He finished his senior season with 51 receptions for 841 yards and five touchdowns.

College career
Rice played in ten games as a freshman and had 25 receptions for 403 yards and one touchdown. He became a starter during his sophomore season and caught 48 passes for 683 yards and five touchdowns. Rice had 64 receptions for 670 yards and nine touchdowns and was named honorable mention All-American Athletic Conference (AAC) as a junior.

References

External links
SMU Mustangs bio

Living people
American football wide receivers
SMU Mustangs football players
Players of American football from Texas
2000 births